Bahudoorapu Batasari is a 1983 Indian Telugu-language drama film, produced and directed by Dasari Narayana Rao. It stars Akkineni Nageswara Rao and Sujatha, with music composed by Ramesh Naidu. The film was recorded as a Super Hit at the box office. The film won two Nandi Awards.

Plot
The film begins with Prasad (Akkineni Nageswara Rao) a sincere cop, who lives with his ideal wife Prabha (Sujatha), two sons Bhanu, Raja (Bhanu Chander, Raja) and a deaf & dumb daughter Suhasini (Suhasini). The couple sacrifices their own requirements to provide the children with everything. As time passes, Prasad couple up them with their love interests. Raja with his maternal uncle's daughter Geeta, Bhanu with a Christian girl Julie (Sumalatha) and Suhasini with another deaf & dumb guy Narayana Rao (Narayana Rao), son of minted Madhusudhan Rao (Prabhakar Reddy) respectively. Meanwhile, Avataram (Dasari Narayana Rao) a close friend of Prasad, suffers his wife Sahastrakoti Suryaprabha (Ramaprabha) & 3 sons with his misery. Besides, he falsifies his extant father (Allu Ramalingaiah) as dead for the property. Meanwhile, Prasad seizes on illegal activities Madhusudhan Rao despite his menacing. At that juncture, Madhusudhan Rao's elder son Eeswar (Eeswar Rao) is knocked out in police encounter when awfully, Prasad is seriously injured in cross-firing and his leg is amputated. Right now, Prasad even loses his job, becomes dependent on his sons but they abandon him. On the double, Suhasini is thrown out by her in-laws, things get worse when Prasad is completely submerged in debts and seeks help for the children. Here, the ungrateful children want to split the parents when angered Prasad boots them and decides to start a new life. During that plight, Prasad rescues a well-off person Satyanarayana (Vanakayala Satyanarayana) against harm, so, to show the gratitude he invests for Prasad. Soon, with his hardship, Prasad becomes a multi-millionaire also revives Suhasini's marital life. On the other side, Avataram's children find their grandfather and teach a lesson to him. At present, Prasad's sons try to retie with their father for his wealth but he turns them down. As a last attempt, they play a suicide drama, knowing it, Prabha rushes, gazing their intention Prasad obstructs her when she chucks with him. After meeting them she realizes the truth and proclaims them to never show their faces. Immediately, she backs up, by the time, distressed Prasad places the entire property in the name of Prabha and leaves the house as a distant nomad. At last, Prabha too accompanies him when their children who are reformed by Avataram plead pardon. Finally, Prasad affirms them to return as self-reliant persons and continues his journey.

Cast

Akkineni Nageswara Rao as Prasad
Sujatha as Prabha 
Dasari Narayana Rao as Avataram
Gummadi as Prasad's father 
Prabhakar Reddy as Madhusudhan Rao
Jaggayya as Prabha's father-in-law 
Allu Ramalingaiah as Avataram's father 
Bhanu Chander as Bhanu 
Ramakrishna as Prabha's brother-in-law
Peketi Sivaram as Siva
Narayana Rao as Murali Krishna 
Raja as Raja
Eeswar Rao as Eeswar Rao 
Vanakayala Satyanarayana as Satyanarayana 
R. Narayana Murthy as Avataram's elder son
Chitti Babu as Avataram's younger son
Sumalatha as Julie 
Suhasini as Subhashini 
Rama Prabha as Sahastrakoti Suryaprabha
Jayamalini as Ananda Bhairavi
Pushpalata as Prasad's mother 
Mamatha as Mangatayaru
Krishnaveni as Saraswathi

Crew
Art: Bhaskar Raju
Choreography: Prakash, Surekha
Stills: Mohanji -Jagan 
Playback: S. P. Balasubrahmanyam, P. Susheela
Music: Ramesh Naidu
Story: Paalagummi Padma Raju, R. K. Dharma Raju
Editing: B. Krishnam Raju
Cinematography: V. S. R. Swamy 
Dialogues - Lyrics - Screenplay - Producer - Director: Dasari Narayana Rao
Banner: Taraka Prabhu Films
Release Date: 16 May 1983

Soundtrack

Music composed by Ramesh Naidu. Lyrics were written by Dasari Narayana Rao. Music released on ACE Audio Company.

Awards
Nandi Awards - 1983 
Best Male Playback Singer - S. P. Balasubrahmanyam
Best Story Writer - Palagummi Padmaraju & R.K. Dharma Raju

Other
 VCDs and DVDs on - SHALIMAR Video Company, Hyderabad

References

External links

Indian drama films
Films directed by Dasari Narayana Rao
Films scored by Ramesh Naidu
1980s Telugu-language films
1983 drama films
1983 films